Voldemārs Matvejs (1877–1914) was a Latvian artist and art theorist. Despite dying in 1914, he was to have a significant impact on the development of Soviet art. Nikolay Punin remarked: "If he had not died so early he would have been the first among us: he knew what was necessary for art better than the others: he saw and understood better than the rest." He was one of the founders of the Union of Youth in 1908.

He had a particular interest in African art and his writing in this area has been compared with that of Carl Einstein.

Faktura

Matvejs was the art theorist who pioneered the concept of Faktura.

Gallery

References

1877 births
1914 deaths
20th-century Latvian artists